William Richard Lavender (1877 – 13 August 1915) was an English painter.

His major works were "Young girl collecting fruit" (1901) "The first observed Transit of the Planet Venus predicted & observed by Jeremiah Horrocks, 24th November 1639" (1903) "In disgrace" (1905) and "Portrait of Giovanni Pergolesi".

William Lavender was buried in Southport, Duke Street Cemetery (Section U, plot No. 6486).

References

See also 
 Williamson Art Gallery & Museum
 Astley Hall Museum and Art Gallery Chorley

1877 births
1915 deaths
19th-century English painters
English male painters
20th-century English painters
English portrait painters
20th-century English male artists
19th-century English male artists